Mutima is the debut album led by bassist Cecil McBee recorded in 1974 and first released on the Strata-East label.

Reception

In his review for AllMusic,  Michael G. Nastos called it "A landmark recording in early creative improvised modern music" and states "McBee as a pure musician has staggering technique, rich harmonic ideas, and an indefatigable swing, but it is as a composer that he is set apart from other musicians of this mid-'70s era ...Mutima (translated as "unseen forces") undoubtedly solidified his stature and brilliance as a major player".

Track listing
All compositions by Cecil McBee
 "From Within" - 11:21
 "Voice of the 7th Angel" - 2:02
 "Life Waves" - 9:13
 "Mutima" - 13:41
 "A Feeling" – 2:38
 "Tulsa Black" - 6:10

Personnel
Cecil McBee - bass
Tex Allen - trumpet, flugelhorn (tracks 2-6)
Art Webb - flute (tracks 2 & 4-6)
Allen Braufman - alto saxophone (tracks 2-6)
George Adams -  tenor saxophone, soprano saxophone (tracks 2-6)
Onaje Allen Gumbs - piano, electric piano (tracks 2-6)
Jimmy Hopps - drums (tracks 2-6)
Jabali Billy Hart -  cymbal, percussion (tracks 2 & 4-6) 
Lawrence Killian - congas (tracks 2 & 4-6)
Michael Carvin - gong, percussion (tracks 2 & 4-6)
Dee Dee Bridgewater - vocals (track 2)
Cecil McBee, Jr. - electric bass (track 6)
Allen Nelson - drums (track 5)

References

 

1974 debut albums
Cecil McBee albums
Strata-East Records albums